Annie Vernay (November 21, 1921 – August 15, 1941) was a French actress, who emerged as a star of the French cinema before her sudden death at the age of nineteen. After winning a beauty contest, Vernay appeared in seven French films including Max Ophüls's The Novel of Werther (1938).

Her performances attracted interest from American studios. While en route to Hollywood via the Atlantic, she contracted typhus and died in Buenos Aires.

Selected filmography
 The Lie of Nina Petrovna (1938)
 Princess Tarakanova (1938)
 The Novel of Werther (1938)
 Hangman's Noose (1940)
 Sing Anyway (1940)

References

External links

Bibliography
 Goble, Alan. The Complete Index to Literary Sources in Film. Walter de Gruyter, 1999.

1921 births
1941 deaths
Swiss film actresses
Actors from Geneva
20th-century Swiss actresses
Swiss expatriates in France
Deaths from typhus